General Sir James Handyside Marshall-Cornwall  (27 May 1887 – 25 December 1985) was a 20th Century British Army soldier and military historian.

Education
Cornwall went to Rugby School and the Royal Military Academy, Woolwich. Commissioned into the Royal Field Artillery in 1907, during his first spell of annual leave he travelled to Germany to study German. He later passed the Civil Service Commission examination as a first-class German interpreter, the first of the eleven interpreterships he was to gain. He passed as first-class interpreter in French, Norwegian, Swedish, Hollander Dutch, and Italian.

Military career
On the outbreak of World War I Cornwall joined the Intelligence Corps at Le Havre. In 1915 he was appointed to the rank of Captain at 2nd Corps Headquarters in the Second Army. In 1916 he was promoted to temporary Major at the General Headquarters of the British Expeditionary Force (BEF), under Sir Douglas Haig. In 1918, Cornwall was posted to the War Office as head of the MI3 section of the military intelligence directorate, where he remained until the armistice.

He was decorated with the Military Cross in 1915, the Distinguished Service Order and the French Legion d'Honneur, both in 1917, the Belgian Ordre de la Couronne and Croix de Guerre in 1918 and the American Distinguished Service Medal in 1919.

In 1919, after attending the first postwar course at the Staff College, Camberley, Cornwall was sent to the peace conference in Paris, where he worked with Reginald Leeper and Harold Nicolson on the new boundaries of Europe. Several jobs in the Middle East in the 1920s gave him the opportunity to study the Turkish and modern Greek languages.

In 1927 he was sent to China with the Royal Artillery (Shanghai Defence Force), to protect British life and property in the Shanghai International Settlement. This enabled him to acquire Mandarin and to travel extensively in the Far East with his wife.

From 1928 to 1932 he held the post of military attaché in Berlin. In 1934, after two years as commander of the 51st Highland division, Royal Artillery, based at Perth, Scotland, Marshall-Cornwall was promoted the rank of Major-General. He spent the next four years travelling in Europe, India, and the United States, then two years in Cairo as head of the British military mission to Egypt. Here he qualified as an interpreter in colloquial Arabic.

In 1938, he was promoted to Lieutenant-General, in charge of the air defences of Great Britain. In May 1940 he went to France to help evacuate British troops from Cherbourg, commanding an ad hoc formation dubbed Norman Force, boarding the last ship to leave the port. He took over command of III Corps in England in June 1940 holding the post until November 1940.

In April 1941 he became General Officer Commanding the British Troops in Egypt. Later that year he was sent by Winston Churchill to Turkey in an attempt to persuade the Turks to enter the war on the Allied side, a mission which failed.

Marshall-Cornwall took over Western Command in November 1941, but was dismissed in the Autumn 1942 for going outside the proper channels to secure the safety of the Liverpool docks. He spent the rest of the war with the Special Operations Executive and MI6, attempting to promote better relations between them. He retired from the army in 1943.

Post military life
Between 1948 and 1951, he was editor-in-chief of the German archives at the Foreign Office captured by the British Army in 1945, and wrote military history. He was president of the Royal Geographical Society (1954–8).

Death
Marshall-Cornwall died, aged 98, on Christmas Day 1985.

Personal life

Cornwall met Marjorie Coralie Scott Owen, who was driving an ambulance for a Red Cross mission to White Russian refugees, while encamped in the Izmit peninsula. They were married in Wales in April 1921. In 1927 he inherited a small estate in Scotland from his uncle William Marshall, on condition that he should assume the surname of Marshall. As Marshall was one of his forenames, this was achieved by the insertion of a hyphen. The Marshall-Cornwalls had a son and two daughters. Their elder daughter died aged fourteen in 1938 after an operation for appendicitis in Switzerland. Their son was killed in France in 1944. He is buried on the spot where he fell, in an orchard near Cahaignes, Normandy. After the war, the landowner presented the site of the grave to the casualty's father, who in turn, requested that the grave remain undisturbed. His other daughter, Janet, married Michael Willoughby, 12th Baron Middleton on 14 October 1947.

Publications
 Geographic Disarmament: A Study of Regional Demilitarisation (1935). 
 Marshal Massena (1965).
 Napoleon (1967).
 Grant as a Military Commander (1970).
 Foch as a Military Commander (1972).
 Haig as a Military Commander (1973).
 History of the Geographical Club (1976).
 A Memoir: Wars & Rumours of Wars (1984) (autobiography).

References

Bibliography

External links
 British Military History Biographies M
Generals of World War II

|-

|-
 

1887 births
1985 deaths
British Army generals of World War II
British Army personnel of World War I
Companions of the Distinguished Service Order
Commanders of the Order of the British Empire
Fellows of the Royal Geographical Society
Presidents of the Royal Geographical Society
Graduates of the Royal Military Academy, Woolwich
Graduates of the Staff College, Camberley
Intelligence Corps officers
Interpreters
Knights Commander of the Order of the Bath
People educated at Rugby School
Recipients of the Military Cross
Royal Artillery officers
British Special Operations Executive personnel
Fellows of the Royal Scottish Geographical Society
20th-century translators
British military attachés
British expatriates in China